Sentimiento or Sentimientos may refer to:

Music

Albums
Sentimiento (album), a 2007 album by Ivy Queen
Sentimiento, album by Omara Portuondo (2005)
Sentimiento, Rubén González (2006)
Sentimiento, Amalia Mendoza (2003) 
Sentimientos, Grupo Límite
Sentimientos, Stravaganzza (2005)
Sentimientos, album by Camilo Sesto (1978)
Sentimientos (album), 1996 album by Charlie Zaa
¡Qué Sentimiento!, Héctor Lavoe (1981)
Sentimiento Tú, Cheo Feliciano (1980)
El Señor Sentimiento, Cheo Feliciano (2009)
Sentimiento Latino, Juan Diego Flórez album (2006)
Nuestro Sentimiento Latino, Larry Harlow release on Coco Records (1981)

Songs
"Sentimiento", a 1965 song by Al Hurricane
"Sentimiento" (song), a song by Colombian pop singer Anasol 2005
"Sentimiento", a 1992 song by Cheo Feliciano from Profundo
"Sentimiento", a song by José Ignacio "Papi" Tovar
"Sentimientos" (Ivy Queen song), a 2007 single from the Sentimiento album
"Sentimientos" (José José song)

See also
Sentimento (Italian and Portuguese)